Anthony Bassey (born 20 July 1994) is a Nigerian footballer who plays as a winger.

References

External links
 

Nigerian footballers
1994 births
Living people
Aspire Academy (Senegal) players
K.A.S. Eupen players
Al-Wakrah SC players
Al-Markhiya SC players
Al-Nojoom FC players
Association football wingers
Belgian Pro League players
Qatari Second Division players
Saudi First Division League players
Expatriate footballers in Belgium
Nigerian expatriate sportspeople in Belgium
Expatriate footballers in Qatar
Nigerian expatriate sportspeople in Qatar
Expatriate footballers in Saudi Arabia
Nigerian expatriate sportspeople in Saudi Arabia